Gabriel Victor David Gonçalves Andersson (born 22 October 2004) is a Swedish footballer who plays as a winger or central midfielder for AIK in Allsvenskan.

Early life
Born in Danderyd, Sweden, to a Guatemalan mother and a Brazilian father, he has both Guatemalan and Swedish citizenships. Andersson grew up in Österåker and started to play youth football with local club IFK Österåker at age five. He later went on to represent IFK Stocksund for two years, before moving to the youth academy of Hammarby IF in 2015. After four seasons with Hammarby, Andersson represented both Nacka United FF and Vasalunds IF in 2019, before moving to Djurgårdens IF in 2020. In 2021, Andersson joined the youth academy of AIK and became part of the senior squad in 2023.

Club career

AIK
On 4 September 2022, Andersson made his debut for AIK in Allsvenskan, coming on as a substitute in a 4–0 home win against GIF Sundsvall. On 24 October the same year, Andersson was promoted to the club's senior squad, signing a five-year contract.

Career statistics

Club

References

External links

2004 births
Living people
Swedish footballers
Association football midfielders
AIK Fotboll players
Allsvenskan players